Greetings is a 2004 Indian Malayalam film by Shajoon Karyal starring Jayasurya and Kavya Madhavan.

Plot
Gopan lived with his widowed father, Aravindakshan Nair, and falls in love with Sheethal, his neighbour. Together they tries the match of former sweethearts Rangaswami Iyengar and Kasthuri who are neighbours. But there is twist when a Chennai-born man Swaminathan who see Sheethal. But in the end Gopan & Sheetal are united.

Cast
Jayasurya as Gopan
Kavya Madhavan as  Sheethal 
Innocent as  Aravindakshan Nair 
Abbas as  Swaminathan 
Siddique as  Rangaswami Iyengar 
Geetha as  Kasthuri 
Salim Kumar as  Vaidyanathan 
Machan Varghese as  Peethambaran 
Vinayakan as  Hari 
 Augustine as  Somasundaran

References

External links
 

2000s Malayalam-language films
2004 romantic comedy films
2004 films
Films directed by Shajoon Kariyal
Indian romantic comedy films
Films scored by Raveendran